Srbija Kargo (Anglicized: Serbia Cargo) is the national state-owned cargo railway company of Serbia.

History

In March 2015, the Government of Serbia announced its plan to establish three new railway companies, splitting the Serbian Railways state-owned company in separate businesses – passenger (Srbija Voz), cargo (Srbija Kargo) and infrastructure (Serbian Railways Infrastructure). Srbija Voz was founded on 10 August 2015, as the national passenger railway company of Serbia, after being split from the Serbian Railways, in the process of reconstruction and better optimization of business.

In May 2018, Srbija Kargo ordered eight Vectron locomotives manufactured by Siemens in Germany, worth 32 million euros. It also announced that it will overhaul its 1,100 wagons during 2018. In August 2019, Srbija Kargo announced the sale of 750 non-operational wagons worth over 2 million euros.

Rolling stock

 Electric locomotives
 ŽS 441 with the total of: 44 units (29 in service)
 ŽS 444 with the total of: 30 units (23 in service)
 ŽS 461 with the total of: 51 units (35 in service)
 ŽS 193 with the total of: 16 units (16 in service & 16 units ordered)
 Diesel locomotives
 ŽS 621 with the total of: 17 units (N/A in service)
 ŽS 641 with the total of: 37 units (11 in service)
 ŽS 642 with the total of: N/A units (N/A in service)
 ŽS 643 with the total of: N/A units (N/A in service)
 ŽS 644 with the total of: 6 units (2 in service)
 ŽS 661 with the total of: 42 units (23 in service)
 ŽS 666 with the total of: 4 units (2 in service)
 ŽS 734 with the total of: N/A units (N/A in service)
  Multisystem locomotives
 193 Vectron with the total of: 16 units (16 in service & 16 units ordered)

See also

 Transport in Serbia
 Serbian Railways
 Serbian Railways Infrastructure
 Srbija Voz

References

External links
 

Companies based in Belgrade
Government-owned companies of Serbia
Rail transport in Serbia
Railway companies established in 2015
Serbian brands
Serbian Railways
Transport companies of Serbia
Serbian companies established in 2015